Naropa can refer to:
Naropa, an 11th-century Indian Buddhist mystic.
Naropa University in Boulder, Colorado; is named in Naropa's honour.